Zhang Ziru (born 10 February 1997) is a Chinese footballer who currently plays for Tianjin Hopeful.

Club career
Zhang Ziru was promoted to Henan Jianye's first team squad in the summer of 2015 season. On 3 May 2017, he made his senior debut in the 2017 Chinese FA Cup in a 5–1 away win against China League Two club Shanghai Sunfun, coming on as a substitute for Feng Gang in the half time. His first league debut came on three days later on 6 May 2017 in a 3–2 win against Chongqing Lifan, coming on for injury Abduwali Ablet in the 65th minute.

Career statistics
.

References

External links
 

1997 births
Living people
Chinese footballers
People from Zhengzhou
Footballers from Henan
Henan Songshan Longmen F.C. players
Chinese Super League players
Association football midfielders